Maybe Tomorrow is the fifth studio album by the Jackson 5, released on April 12, 1971 by Motown Records. Released after the success of the hit ballad "I'll Be There", most of the tracks on the album are ballads, with few dance numbers. The album includes the hit singles "Never Can Say Goodbye" and "Maybe Tomorrow". While not as financially successful as the Jackson 5's first three outings, Maybe Tomorrow contains some of the most often-sampled and covered material in the group's catalogue.  The album also spent six weeks at No. 1 on the US Soul Albums chart.

Maybe Tomorrow was arranged by noteworthy record producers Gene Page and James Anthony Carmichael.

Track listing
 "Maybe Tomorrow" (The Corporation) – 4:41
 "She's Good" (The Corporation) – 2:59
 "Never Can Say Goodbye" (Clifton Davis) – 2:57
 "The Wall" (Mel Larson, Jerry Marcellino, Pam Sawyer) – 3:03
 "Petals" (The Corporation) – 2:34
 "Sixteen Candles" (originally performed by The Crests as "16 Candles")  (Luther Dixon, Allyson R. Khent) – 2:45
 "(We've Got) Blue Skies" (Thomas Bee, Chris Clark, Fuller Gordy, Patrick Stephenson, Delores Wilkinson) – 3:21
 "My Little Baby" (The Corporation) – 2:58
 "It's Great to Be Here" (The Corporation) – 2:59
 "Honey Chile" (originally performed by Martha Reeves & the Vandellas) (Richard Morris, Sylvia Moy) – 2:45
 "I Will Find a Way" (The Corporation) – 2:57

Re-release
In 2001, Motown Records remastered all Jackson 5 albums in a "Two Classic Albums/One CD" series (much like they did in the late 1980s). This album was paired up with Third Album. The bonus tracks were "Sugar Daddy", the only new track on their 1971 greatest hits set, and "I'm So Happy", the B-side of that single.

Charts

Weekly charts

Year-end charts

See also
List of number-one R&B albums of 1971 (U.S.)

References

External links
  Maybe Tomorrow overview at www.jackson5abc.com

1971 albums
The Jackson 5 albums
Motown albums
Albums arranged by Gene Page
Albums produced by Hal Davis
Albums produced by the Corporation (record production team)